To Hare is Human is a 1956 Warner Bros. Merrie Melodies cartoon directed by Chuck Jones. The short was released on December 15, 1956, and stars Bugs Bunny and Wile E. Coyote. In this film, Wile builds a UNIVAC computer, and grows to rely on its answers.

Plot
Wile E. Coyote walks out of his cave, carrying a foldable elevator to capture Bugs Bunny who is successfully captured and placed inside a sack. But Bugs is able to make some breathing room for himself by getting out of the sack. He then asks "Ehhh, whatya got in the bag, Doc?" to which the coyote apologizes for being rude even to his breakfast. The coyote then proceeds to introduce himself with a calling card (Wile E. Coyote, Genius, Have brain, Will travel). Bugs comments, "Have brain, eh? Hey that must be very handy at times." Upon hearing this, the coyote begins a long reply about how his brain will prove handy by predicting that Bugs will escape from the bag, having bought some time through the coyote's lengthy reply. Wile E. then concludes that he and Bugs both know that there is nothing left in the bag, but Bugs questions him otherwise, that is something else in the bag, which is rigged dynamite, having got out of the bag just as the coyote predicted. Bugs is proven to be right, when Wile E.'s face turns grey from the explosion inside the bag. This buys the rabbit some time to escape, and the coyote promptly chases him. But what Wile E. does not know that Bugs has rigged some dynamite inside his foldable elevator, and when he presses a button to descend down the rabbit hole, the elevator explodes, with the wall and door panels toppling and his whole body becoming grey due to the explosion ("Poor chap, he had his chance. Now he must take the consequences!"). The coyote retreats back to his cave, carrying the destroyed elevator, then, inside his cave, has ordered & built a super smart computer called the Acme UNIVAC, a device that MIGHT help him capture Bugs once and for all.

1.   In the first attempt to capture Bugs using the UNIVAC as an assistant tool, Wile E. spies on Bugs going down his rabbit hole and securing it with a rotating-type combination lock. On the UNIVAC, Wile E. presses the following buttons in sequence: RABBIT->HOLE->COMBINATION LOCK, and programs the computer to output a piece of paper which contains the combination pattern needed to unlock Bugs's hole. Later that night, Wile E. sneaks in to unlock the lock, but Bugs seems to be prepared for this when he hears the coyote unlocking the lock, and he throws an "emergency" banana peel to the bottom of the ladder from a glassbox (Label: In case of coyote, break glass). Surely enough, as Wile E. descends down the ladder, he slips and throws himself off a cliff through a "Coyote Disposal Chute".

2.  Morning then comes, and Bugs is busy preparing his breakfast. Again, Wile E., on his second attempt to capture Bugs, spies on him preparing toasted carrots. This prompts the coyote to press the following buttons on the UNIVAC in sequence: BREAKFAST->TOASTER->CARROTS. The computer then offers a solution: substituting hand grenades for the carrots. The coyote then proceeds to the hole to make the substitution. It succeeds, but the toaster's spring malfunctions, springing the grenades back to the surface where Wile E. stands ("OH NO!"). With the rabbit missing the supposed "toasted carrots" for breakfast, he comments: "One of these days, I'm gonna have to have that spring fixed."

3.  On his third attempt, Wile E., clueless, presses the following buttons on the UNIVAC: WHAT->NOW. Without showing to the audience the contents of the paper, the computer offers another solution: suck up the rabbit using a bathroom plunger. The coyote then proceeds to do the task, but Bugs counteracts it by installing a chute through another hole, which sucks up the coyote. Upon being sucked, Wile E. retreats.

4.  The fourth attempt of Wile E. now employs slipping a dynamite (TNT stick) into the vacuum cleaner that Bugs currently uses to clean up his place. The plan works, but the dynamite does not explode. Bugs then climbs up to throw the trash that the vacuum cleaner has gathered to the nearest trash can (where Wile E. is hiding inside). Smokes emerging from inside indicate that the rabbit has re-ignited the fuse of the dynamite, and the dynamite explodes, warping the trash can in the process. Wile E.'s greyed-out head appears momentarily until the lid (which was launched upward when the dynamite exploded) knocks him out.

5.  On the fifth and final attempt, the computer suggests trying a booby trap in the carrot patch. Wile E. promptly does this, rigging up a carrot in the patch to a boulder (which should fall off and crush Bugs), and hides. The rabbit then climbs up to harvest the carrots while singing ("Carrots wait for no one, so I pick them now, before they are eaten, by some slobby cow..."), and picks up the rigged carrot. But the trap does not activate, and, in frustration, Wile E. proceeds to check whether the trap works or not. Upon touching the rope, the trap activates, making the rock boulder fall. Now panicking, Wile E. inputs on the UNIVAC: "ROCK -> FALLING. WHAT'LL I DO?" To which the computer responds, "Go back and take your medicine." The coyote then scurries back to the carrot patch, and gets crushed by the boulder. It is then revealed that the brain behind the UNIVAC is actually Bugs, who says, "Of course the real beauty of this machine, is that it has only one moving part." shaking his head and swirling his eyebrows.

Production notes
The title is a play on the expression, "To err is human; to forgive, divine." This was also the final cartoon to be made at Termite Terrace before the studio moved to the Burbank lot.

Home media
The short was released on the Looney Tunes Golden Collection: Volume 4, Disc One.

References

External links

 

1956 films
1956 animated films
1956 short films
Merrie Melodies short films
Warner Bros. Cartoons animated short films
Wile E. Coyote and the Road Runner films
Short films directed by Chuck Jones
Films scored by Milt Franklyn
Bugs Bunny films
1950s Warner Bros. animated short films
Films with screenplays by Michael Maltese
Films about computing
UNIVAC
Films produced by Edward Selzer
1950s English-language films